The de Havilland C.24 was a two-seat autogyro built by de Havilland at its Stag Lane works in England in 1931

Design and development
The C.24 was built in 1931 using a Cierva rotor head coupled to the cabin of a de Havilland DH.80A Puss Moth, and driven by a 120 hp Gipsy III engine. It was withdrawn from use by December 1934.

A single example (G-ABLM) was produced and is part of the Science Museum collection. In 1932, it was redesignated C.26 (not to be confused with the unbuilt C.26 twin-engine autogiro design) when a two-blade rotor system was installed. Since 2008 it has been on loan to the de Havilland Aircraft Museum at Salisbury Hall, near London Colney in Hertfordshire.

Specifications

References

Citations

Bibliography

External links

 

C.24 Autogryo
1930s British civil utility aircraft
Single-engined tractor autogyros
Aircraft first flown in 1931
C.24